Bemeizid is used in Jewish law to indicate that something was done on purpose. This matters in order to determine how culpable someone is for his actions. The opposite adjective is שוגג shogeg, "not on purpose."

In order to for an action to be considered deliberate, it must have been done with the knowledge that it was wrong, and with the intention of doing the action, and of his own free will.  If he did not know the action was forbidden, or if a mistake of fact concerning his circumstances led him to believe that he was permitted to take that action in that situation, he is considered to have done the action beshogeg, "not on purpose." If he was forced to do the action, then it was done beones.

See also 
 Mens rea

References

Jewish law principles
Hebrew words and phrases in Jewish law